Goh Ballet Academy is a school of classical ballet in Vancouver, British Columbia. Founded in 1978, the Goh Ballet Academy offers dance and ballet classes for children and adults, and has also toured internationally. Former principal dancer of the National Ballet of Canada, Chan-hon Goh is currently the director of the academy.

History
The Goh Ballet Academy was founded in 1978 by Choo Chiat Goh and Lin Yee Goh after they immigrated to Vancouver, British Columbia, Canada from China.  Choo Chiat Goh is the brother of the late Choo San Goh, the former resident choreographer of the Washington Ballet, and is also the founder of the Goh Ballet Youth Company, which is aimed at advancing students for a professional career.  Choo Chiat Goh had trained on scholarship at London’s The Royal Ballet. From there he joined Beijing Dance Academy and in 1959 joined the National Ballet of China. His wife Lin Yee Goh also trained at the Beijing Dance Academy and eventually became one of the National Ballet of China’s ballet mistresses. At the academy, she incorporated Royal Academy of Dance curriculum into the academy and has studied and taught in the Vaganova method, studying technique and teaching elements under Russian master Nikolai Romancheva.

The Gohs' daughter, Chan-hon Goh, was principal dancer of the National Ballet of Canada for 20 years and is the current director of the academy.  Chan Hon Goh was also a prize recipient of the Prix de Lausanne, an annual international competition for youth in Switzerland who seek to pursue professional careers.  As the academy's director, Chan Hon Goh has introduced a master class series for aspiring dancers seeking to enhance professional training and receive coaching and provide opportunities for featured artists to mentor participants and focus on artistic elements not typically accessible in standard ballet classes.  The master classes will be hosted in nine cities: Toronto, Montreal, Winnipeg, Edmonton, Calgary, Saskatoon, Kelowna, Nanaimo and Vancouver.

Classes
The Goh Academy offers a junior school for ages four and up, plus beginning ballet training and a senior professional program for levels of elementary, intermediate, and advanced students ages 12 and up. The senior professional program provides a curriculum that includes ballet, pointe, repertoire, men's work, body conditioning and stretching, choreography, contemporary dance, pas de deux, performance workshop, nutrition, and ballet history courses. The program offers full day classes for dedicated students pursuing careers in professional dance, with training primarily in the Vaganova method, as well as classes in jazz, pointe work, and contemporary dance, and exposure to internationally renowned guest teachers. Half day programs are offered to aspiring dancers who still want to achieve their academic goals. These students work through the SPARTS (School’s Performing Athletic and Arts) program as part of the Vancouver School Board grades 8 - 12 educational curriculum. Auditions are needed to be accepted into the senior professional program, half and full day, which is open to "high performance" individuals who are committed to their education and training.

Goh Ballet Academy also offers adult classes and summer intensives.

Tours
Goh Ballet has toured Malaysia, Singapore, Japan, People’s Republic of China, Hong Kong, and the United States. In 1994, the youth company was the first Canadian institution to be asked to perform at Rencontres Internationales de la Danse Festival in La Baule, France where its performance had eight curtain calls.

Performances
Since 2009, the Goh Ballet has produced its own performance of The Nutcracker with commissioned choreography by Anna-Marie Holmes.  Unlike other productions, the Goh Ballet Academy’s performance of The Nutcracker is not strictly selective to their academy and features visiting professionals from international companies alongside academy students across Vancouver.  Executive producer of Vancouver's Nutcracker ballet, Chan-hon Goh describes it as "its own entity. It's meant for the city."

Additional performances at the academy include an end of year performance which has dedicated class time and Goh Academy students only performance. The Goh Youth Ballet Company has more opportunities for students, with its goal to provide time for students to perform in front of an audience and prepare them for professional careers. All students are welcome to audition for the company and perform with the GYBC.

Awards
Outstanding School Award (Youth America Grand Prix 2008)
Outstanding Champion for the Arts (Arts and Culture Week 2008)
Solo Seal Award (Royal Academy of Dance) (20 students have achieved the highest examination honour)
Canadian Immigrant Top 25 Award 2017

Founders awards
YWCA Women of Distinction Award (2013)
Queen Elizabeth II Diamond Jubilee Medal (2013)
FMA Vancouver Art Achievement Award (2010)
National Association of Asian American Professionals 100 Award (NAAAP) (2010)
Genée International Ballet Competition – Silver Medal (1988)
Illustrious Prix de Lausanne – Prize (1986)

Notable alumni 
Frances Chung, principal dancer of San Francisco Ballet
Yuka Ebihara, principal dancer of Polish National Ballet
Céline Gittens, principal dancer of Birmingham Royal Ballet
Chan-hon Goh, director of Goh. Ballet Academy, former principal dancer of National Ballet of Canada

References

External links
 
 https://web.archive.org/web/20140703205813/http://www.gohballet.com/news_media.html

Ballet schools in Canada